Bishop Keough Regional High School was a private, Roman Catholic, all-girls high school in Pawtucket, Rhode Island.  It was located in the Roman Catholic Diocese of Providence.

Background
Incorporated in 1971, Bishop Keough had students from Pawtucket, Lincoln, North Providence, Cumberland, Smithfield, Woonsocket, Greenville, Johnston, Cranston, Central Falls, East Providence, Providence, and other outlying areas. The school closed in 2015. Current and prospective students were encouraged to enroll at the St. Raphael Academy, a co-educational Catholic high school, also located in Pawtucket.

See also

Catholic schools in the United States
Higher education
List of Rhode Island schools
Parochial school
St. Mary Academy – Bay View - Another girls' school in Rhode Island

Notes and references

External links
 School Website (archived)

Catholic secondary schools in Rhode Island
Schools in Providence County, Rhode Island
Educational institutions established in 1971
Educational institutions disestablished in 2015
Defunct girls' schools in the United States
Girls' schools in Rhode Island
Roman Catholic Diocese of Providence
Buildings and structures in Pawtucket, Rhode Island
1971 establishments in Rhode Island
2015 disestablishments in Rhode Island